is a Japanese actress and singer. She is a former member of the idol girl group AKB48, and was one of the most prominent members in the group at the time, regarded as the group's "absolute ace", "immovable center", and the "Face of AKB." After graduating from AKB48 on August 27, 2012, Maeda has since then continued with a solo singing and acting career.

Career

AKB48

Maeda was born in Ichikawa, Chiba. At age 14, she became a member of AKB48's first group, Team A, which was composed of 24 girls and debuted on December 8, 2005.

In 2009, Maeda won the first edition of AKB48's annual general elections, which are described as a popularity contest. As a result, she was the headlined performer for the group's 13th single, "Iiwake Maybe". The following year, she placed second overall, but still had a significant choreography position in the lineup for "Heavy Rotation". Later that year, AKB48 employed a rock-paper-scissors tournament to determine the top spot of AKB48's 19th major single "Chance no Junban". Maeda placed 15th, which secured her a spot on title track. Maeda also won the group's third general election held in 2011.

Maeda was one of the members who sang on every AKB48 title track since the group's inception. Her streak of A-side appearances ended in 2011, when she lost to Team K captain Sayaka Akimoto at a rock-paper-scissors tournament which determined the featured members for the group's 24th single "Ue kara Mariko".

On March 25, 2012, during an AKB48 Concert at the Saitama Super Arena, Maeda announced that she would leave the group. This caused a large buzz in the Japanese news, and spawned a rumor (later proved false) that a student from University of Tokyo had committed suicide over the announcement. AKB48 later announced that Maeda would leave after the Tokyo Dome concerts; For her final performance, there were 229,096 requests filed for seat tickets. Her farewell performance and ceremony occurred on August 27 at the AKB48 theater, and was streamed live on YouTube.

Solo career
On April 23, 2011, Maeda announced that she would make her solo debut with her debut single "Flower", released on June 22. It was met with commercial success in Japan, debuting at number 1 on the Oricon Charts with first week sales of 176,967 copies.

The follow-up single "Kimi wa Boku Da", released in June 2012, was Maeda's last solo single while still a member of AKB48. It debuted at number two on the Oricon charts and reached number one on the Billboard Japan Hot 100.

On June 15, 2013, at AKB48's handshake event held at Makuhari Messe, AKB48 announced that Maeda would appear as a special guest at the group's summer concert series at the Sapporo Dome on July 31. There, she performed her third single, which was later released on September 18. It was selected to be the theme song for the live-action adaptation of Yamada-kun to 7-nin no Majo (Yamada and the Seven Witches). Maeda described the song as "cheerful and fun" and hoped it would liven up the show. "Time Machine Nante Iranai" eventually peaked at number one on the Oricon Daily charts, and number two on the Oricon Weekly chart. On Billboard's Japan Hot 100, it debuted at number one and stayed there for just the week of September 30.

Maeda's 4th single "Seventh Code" was released on March 5, 2014. It was used as the theme song of the movie "Seventh Code" in which Maeda herself starred. It debuted at number 4 on the Oricon charts and reached number three on the Billboard Japan Hot 100.

On December 12, 2015, it was announced that Maeda's first album would be released later the next year. Eventually, the album was set to be released on June 22, 2016.

Acting career

In 2007, Maeda played a supporting role in the film Ashita no Watashi no Tsukurikata, which was her debut as an actress. She starred in the 2011 film Moshidora and appeared in Nobuhiro Yamashita's 2012 film Kueki Ressha. She also starred in Hideo Nakata's 2013 horror film The Complex. It was announced that she would co-star with Tony Leung Chiu-wai in Kiyoshi Kurosawa's film 1905.

In 2013, Maeda starred in a series of 30-second station ID videos for Music On! TV where she played Tamako, a Tokyo University graduate who does not find a job and lives at home where she just eats and sleeps, over the course of the four seasons. This became a TV drama special, and was developed into a full-fledged film, Tamako in Moratorium, the last of which was planned for a theater release in November 2013.

Maeda starred in the film Seventh Code, in which she plays a Japanese woman in Russia who is trying to track down a guy she previously met. The film was shown at the Rome Film Festival in November 2013, and was released for a short theater run in January 2014. She released a single of the same name on March 5.

In May 2015, it was announced that Maeda had been cast in the role of Kyoko Yoshizawa, the female lead of the anime and manga series Dokonjō Gaeru (The Gutsy Frog), in a live-action version of the story set to air on Nippon TV in July.

In 2016, she took the lead role of the drama "Busujima Yuriko no Sekirara Nikki" on TBS. The first episode is set to air on April 20, 2016.

In 2019, she appeared in Kiyoshi Kurosawa's To the Ends of the Earth (旅のおわり世界のはじまり), playing Yoko, a television host and would-be singer who goes to Uzbekistan with a small crew to shoot a travel documentary. In the film, she twice sings the classic Édith Piaf anthem, Hymne à l'amour (with Japanese lyrics], including in the finale.

Personal life
Maeda married actor Ryo Katsuji; they registered their marriage on July 30, 2018. She gave birth to their first child, a son in 2019. On April 23, 2021, she announced that they have amicably divorced.

Discography

Solo singles

AKB48

Filmography

Films

Television dramas
 Swan no Baka!: Sanmanen no Koi (2007)
 Shiori to Shimiko no Kaiki Jikenbo (2008)
 Taiyo to Umi no Kyoshitsu (2008)
 Majisuka Gakuen (2010)
 Ryōmaden (2010)
 Q10 (2010)
 Sakura Kara no Tegami (2011)
 Hanazakari no Kimitachi e (2011)
 Majisuka Gakuen 2 (2011)
 Saikou no Jinsei (2012)
 Kasuka na Kanojo (2013)
 Nobunaga Concerto Episode 3 (2014)
 Leaders (2014) - Misuzu Shimabara
 Kageri Yuku Natsu (2015) – Yu Kahara (witness of infant kidnapping case)
 Dokonjō Gaeru (2015)
 Majisuka Gakuen 5 (2015)
 Busujima Yuriko no Sekirara Nikki (2016) - Yuriko Busujima
 Gou Gou, The Cat 2 - Iida (2016)
 Shuukatsu Kazoku(2017)
 Inspector Zenigata - Detective Natsuki Sakuraba (2017)
 Leaders 2 (2017) - Misuzu Shimabara
 The Legendary Mother (2020)
 Modern Love Tokyo (2022) - Aya

Television shows
 AKBingo! (2008–2012)
 Shukan AKB (2009–2012)
 AKB48 Nemōsu TV (2008–2012)
 Gachi Gase (2012)

Documentaries
 Documentary of AKB48: The Future 1 mm Ahead (2011)
 Documentary of AKB48: To Be Continued (2011)
 Documentary of AKB48: Show Must Go On (2012)
 Documentary of AKB48: No Flower Without Rain (2013)

Radio shows
 Atsuko Maeda's Heart Songs (2010–2013)

Bibliography
 Hai (2009)
 Acchan in Hawaii (2010)
 Maeda Atsuko in Tokyo (2010)
 Atsuko in NY (2010)
 Bukiyō (2012)
 AKB48 Sotsugyo Kinen Photobook "Acchan" (2012)

Awards and nominations

References

External links 

  
 Official agency profile at Ohta Pro 
 

1991 births
Living people
AKB48 members
Japanese idols
Japanese women pop singers
Sony Music Entertainment Japan artists
Japanese child actresses
People from Ichikawa, Chiba
King Records (Japan) artists
Musicians from Chiba Prefecture
Japanese film actresses
21st-century Japanese actresses
21st-century Japanese women singers
21st-century Japanese singers